Shakespeare: The Animated Tales (also known as The Animated Shakespeare) is a series of twelve half-hour animated television adaptations of the plays of William Shakespeare, originally broadcast on BBC2 and S4C between 1992 and 1994.

The series was commissioned by the Welsh language channel S4C. Production was co-ordinated by the Dave Edwards Studio in Cardiff, although the shows were animated in Moscow by Soyuzmultfilm, using a variety of animation techniques. The scripts for each episode were written by Leon Garfield, who produced heavily truncated versions of each play. The academic consultant for the series was Professor Stanley Wells. The dialogue was recorded at the facilities of BBC Wales in Cardiff.

The show was both a commercial and a critical success. The first series episode "Hamlet" won two awards for "Outstanding Individual Achievement in Animation" (one for the animators and one for the designers and director) at the 1993 Emmys, and a Gold Award at the 1993 New York Festival. The second-season episode "The Winter's Tale" also won the "Outstanding Individual Achievement in Animation" at the 1996 Emmys. The episodes continue to be used in schools as teaching aids, especially when introducing children to Shakespeare for the first time. However, the series has been critiqued for the large number of scenes cut to make the episodes shorter in length.

In the United States, the series aired on HBO and featured live-action introductions by Robin Williams.

Development

Creation
The series was conceived in 1989 by Christopher Grace, head of animation at S4C. Grace had previously worked with Soyuzmultfilm on an animated version of the Welsh folktale cycle, the Mabinogion, and he turned to them again for the Shakespeare project, feeling "if we were going to animate Shakespeare in a thirty-minute format, then we had to go to a country that we knew creatively and artistically could actually deliver. And in my view, frankly, there was only one country that could do it in the style that we wanted, that came at it from a different angle, a country to whom Shakespeare is as important as it is to our own." Grace was also very keen to avoid creating anything Disney-esque; "Disney has conditioned a mass audience to expect sentimentality; big, gooey-eyed creatures with long lashes, and winsome, simpering female characters. This style went with enormous flair and verve and comic panache; but a lot of it was kitsch."

The series was constructed by recording the scripts before any animation had been done. Actors were hired to recite abbreviated versions of the plays written by Leon Garfield, who had written a series of prose adaptations of Shakespeare's plays for children in 1985, Shakespeare Stories. According to Garfield, editing the plays down to thirty minutes whilst maintaining original Shakespearean dialogue was not easy; "lines that are selected have to carry the weight of narrative, and that's not always easy. It frequently meant using half a line, and then skipping perhaps twenty lines, and then finding something that would sustain the rhythm but at the same time carry on the story. The most difficult by far were the comedies. In the tragedies, you have a very strong story going straight through, sustained by the protagonist. In the comedies, the structure is much more complex." Garfield compared the task of trying to rewrite the plays as half-hour pieces as akin to "painting the ceiling of the Sistine Chapel on a postage stamp." To maintain narrative integrity, Garfield added non-Shakespearean voice-over narration to each episode, which would usually introduce the episode and then fill in any plot points skipped over by the dialogue. The use of a narrator was also employed by Charles Lamb and Mary Lamb in their own prose versions of Shakespeare's plays for children, Tales from Shakespeare, published in 1807, to which Garfield's work is often compared. However, fidelity to the original texts was paramount in the minds of the creators as the episodes sought "to educate their audience into an appreciation and love of Shakespeare, out of a conviction of Shakespeare as a cultural artifact available to all, not restricted to a narrowly defined form of performance. Screened in dozens of countries, The Animated Tales is Shakespeare as cultural educational television available to all."

The dialogue was recorded at the sound studios of BBC Wales in Cardiff. During the recording, Garfield himself was present, as was literary advisor, Stanley Wells, as well as the Russian directors. All gave input to the actors during the recording sessions. The animators then took the voice recordings back to Moscow and began to animate them. At this stage, the project was overseen by Dave Edwards, who co-ordinated the Moscow animation with S4C. Edwards' job was to keep one eye on the creative aspects of the productions and one eye on the financial and practical aspects. This didn't make him especially popular with some of the directors, but his role was an essential one if the series was to be completed on time and under budget. According to Elizabeth Babakhina, executive producer of the series in Moscow, the strict rules brought into play by Edwards actually helped the directors; "Maybe at long last our directors will learn that you can't break deadlines. In the past, directors thought "If I make a good film, people will forgive me anything." Now they've begun to understand that they won't necessarily be forgiven even if they make a great film. It has to be a great film, and be on time."

Publicity
There was considerable media publicity prior to the initial broadcast of the first season, with the then Prince Charles commenting "I welcome this pioneering project which will bring Shakespeare's great wisdom, insight and all-encompassing view of mankind to many millions from all parts of the globe, who have never been in his company before." An article in the Radio Times wrote "as a result of pre-sales alone, tens of millions of people are guaranteed to see it and Shakespeare is guaranteed for his best year since the First Folio was published in 1623." One commentator who was distinctly unimpressed with the adaptations, however, was scholar and lecturer Terence Hawkes who wrote of the episodes, "they will be of no use. They are packages of stories based on the Shakespearean plots, which themselves were not original. So they aren't going to provide much insight into Shakespeare."

The second season aired two years after the first, and received considerably less media attention.

Legacy
A major part of the project was the educational aspect of the series, especially the notion of introducing children to Shakespeare for the first time. The series was made available to schools along with a printed copy of the script for each episode, complete with illustrations based on, but not verbatim copies of, the Russian animation. The printed scripts were slightly longer than Garfield's final filmed versions, but remained heavily truncated. Each text also came with a study guide for teachers. The Animated Tales have gone on to become "one of the most widely used didactic tools in British primary and secondary schools."

In 1996, the producers created a follow-up series, Testament: The Bible in Animation.

In 2000, Christopher Grace launched the Shakespeare Schools Festival (SSF) using Leon Garfield's twelve abridged scripts. The festival takes place annually, with hundreds of school children performing half-hour shows in professional theatres across the UK.

Series one

A Midsummer Night's Dream
 Directed and designed by Robert Saakiants
 Originally aired: 9 November 1992
 Animation type: Cel animation

 Menna Trussler as Narrator
 Daniel Massey as Oberon
 Suzanne Bertish as Titania
 Anthony Jackson as Puck
 Abigail McKern as Hermia
 Kathryn Pogson as Helena
 Charles Millham as Demetrius
 Kim Wall as Lysander
 Bernard Hill as Bottom
 Peter Postlethwaite as Quince
 Anna Linstrum as Fairy
 Lorraine Cole as Fairy

The Tempest
 Directed by Stanislav Sokolov
 Designed by Elena Livanova
 Originally aired: 16 November 1992
 Animation type: Stop motion puppet animation

 Martin Jarvis as Narrator
 Timothy West as Prospero
 Alun Armstrong as Caliban
 Ella Mood as Ariel
 Katy Behean as Miranda
 Jonathan Tafler as Ferdinand
 John Moffatt as Alonzo
 James Greene as Gonzalo
 Sion Probert as Sebastian
 Peter Guinness as Antonio
 Stephen Thorne as Stephano
 Ric Jerrom as Trinculo

Macbeth
 Directed by Nikolai Serebryakov
 Designed by Vladimir Morozov and Ildar Urmanche
 Originally aired: 23 November 1992
 Animation type: Cel animation

 Alec McCowen as Narrator
 Brian Cox as Macbeth
 Zoë Wanamaker as Lady Macbeth
 Laurence Payne as Duncan
 Patrick Brennan as Banquo
 Clive Merrison as Macduff
 Mary Wimbush as Witch
 Val Lorraine as Witch
 Emma Gregory as Witch
 Richard Pearce as Donalbain
 David Acton as Malcolm
 John Baddeley as Lennox

Romeo and Juliet
 Directed by Efim Gamburg
 Designed by Igor Makarov
 Originally aired: 30 November 1992
 Animation type: Cel animation

 Felicity Kendal as Narrator
 Linus Roache as Romeo
 Clare Holman as Juliet
 Jonathan Cullen as Benvolio
 Greg Hicks as Mercutio
 Brenda Bruce as Nurse
 Garard Green as Friar Laurence
 Brendan Charleson as Tybalt
 Charles Kay as Capulet
 Maggie Steed as Lady Capulet

Hamlet
 Directed by Natalya Orlova
 Designed by Peter Kotov and Natalia Demidova
 Originally aired: 7 December 1992
 Animation type: Paint on glass

 Michael Kitchen as Narrator
 Nicholas Farrell as Hamlet
 John Shrapnel as Claudius and The Ghost
 Susan Fleetwood as Gertrude
 Tilda Swinton as Ophelia
 John Warner as Polonius
 Dorien Thomas as Horatio
 Andrew Wincott as Laertes

Twelfth Night
 Directed by Maria Muat
 Designed by Ksenia Prytkova
 Originally aired: 14 December 1992
 Animation type: Stop motion puppet animation

 Rosemary Leach as Narrator
 Fiona Shaw as Viola
 Roger Allam as Duke Orsino
 Suzanne Burden as Olivia
 Gerald James as Malvolio
 William Rushton as Toby Belch
 Stephen Tompkinson as Sir Andrew
 Alice Arnold as Maria
 Stefan Bednarczyk as Feste
 Hugh Grant as Sebastian

Series two

Richard III
 Directed by Natalya Orlova
 Designed by Peter Kotov
 Originally aired: 2 November 1994
 Animation type: Paint on glass

 Antony Sher as Richard
 Alec McCowen as Narrator
 Eleanor Bron as Duchess of York
 Tom Wilkinson as Buckingham
 James Grout as Catesby/Ely
 Sorcha Cusack as Queen Elizabeth
 Suzanne Burden as Anne
 Stephen Thorne as Hastings/Cardinal
 Michael Maloney as Clarence/Norfolk
 Spike Hood as Prince Edward
 Hywel Nelson as Duke of York
 Patrick Brennan as Richmond/2nd Murderer
 Philip Bond as Tyrrel
 Brendan Charleson as 1st Murderer/Messenger

The Taming of the Shrew
 Directed by Aida Ziablikova
 Designed by Olga Titova
 Originally aired: 9 November 1994
 Animation type: Stop motion puppet animation

 Amanda Root as Kate
 Nigel Le Vaillant as Petruchio
 Malcolm Storry as Sly/Nathaniel
 Manon Edwards as Bianca
 John Warner as Gremio/Servant/Tailor
 Gerald James as Baptista
 Lawmary Champion as Hostess/Widow
 Hilton McRae as Hortensio/Peter
 Richard Pearce as Lucentio
 Big Mick as Narrator

As You Like It
 Directed by Alexei Karayev
 Designed by Valentin Olshvang
 Originally aired: 16 November 1994
 Animation type: Paint on glass (using watercolors)

 Sylvestra Le Touzel as Rosalind
 Maria Miles as Celia/Audrey
 John McAndrew as Orlando
 Peter Gunn as Touchstone/Messenger
 David Holt as Silvius/Hymen
 Nathaniel Parker as Jacques/Oliver
 Stefan Bernarczyk as Amiens/Lord
 Christopher Benjamin as Duke Frederick/Corin
 Garard Green as Duke Senior/Adam
 Eiry Thomas as Phoebe
 David Burke as Narrator

Julius Caesar
 Directed by Yuri Kulakov
 Designed by Galina Melko and Victor Chuguyevsky
 Originally aired: 30 November 1994
 Animation type: Cel animation

 Joss Ackland as Caesar
 Frances Tomelty as Calphurnia
 David Robb as Brutus
 Hugh Quarshie as Cassius
 Jim Carter as Mark Antony
 Judith Sharp as Portia
 Peter Woodthorpe as Casca
 Andrew Wincott as Narrator/Octavius
 Dillwyn Owen as Soothsayer/Trebonius
 Tony Leader as Cinna/Decius
 John Miers as Lucius

The Winter's Tale
 Directed by Stanislav Sokolov
 Designed by Helena Livanova
 Originally aired: 7 December 1994
 Animation type: Stop motion puppet animation

 Anton Lesser as Leontes
 Jenny Agutter as Hermione
 Sally Dexter as Paulina
 Michael Kitchen as Polixenes
 Adrienne O'Sullivan as Perdita
 Stephen Tompkinson as Autolycus
 Philip Voss as Shepherd/Judge
 Simon Harris as Shepherd's Son/Servant
 Jonathan Tafler as Camillo
 Timothy Bateson as Antigonus
 Jonathan Firth as Florizel
 Spike Hood as Shepherd's Young Son
 Hywel Nelson as Mamillius
 Roger Allam as Narrator

Othello
 Directed and designed by Nikolai Serebryakov
 Originally aired: 14 December 1994
 Animation type: Cel animation

 Colin McFarlane as Othello
 Gerard McSorley as Iago
 Philip Franks as Cassio
 Sian Thomas as Desdemona
 Dinah Stabb as Emilia/Bianca
 Terry Dauncey as Brabantio
 Ivor Roberts as Duke/Lodovico
 Simon Ludders as Roderigo
 Philip Bond as Narrator

See also
 An Age of Kings (1960)
 The Spread of the Eagle (1963)
 The Wars of the Roses (1963; 1965)
 BBC Television Shakespeare (1978–1985)
 ShakespeaRe-Told (2005)
 The Hollow Crown (2012; 2016)

References

External links
 
 

1992 British television series debuts
1994 British television series endings
1990s British animated television series
BBC Television shows
English-language television shows
Films based on A Midsummer Night's Dream
Films based on As You Like It
Films based on Hamlet
Films based on Julius Caesar (play)
Films based on Macbeth
Films based on Othello
Films based on Richard III (play)
Films based on Romeo and Juliet
Films based on The Taming of the Shrew
Films based on The Tempest
Films based on Twelfth Night
Films based on works by William Shakespeare
Russian animated films
Television series set in the 15th century
Films based on The Winter's Tale